Tomato pie may refer to a "pie with tomatoes", such as:
Southern tomato pie, a type of savory pie from the Southern United States
Green tomato pie, a sweet pie made with green tomatoes 

Tomato pie may refer to some types of pizza in the United States, such as:
Sicilian pizza, a type of pizza that originated in Sicily
New Haven-style pizza, specifically the "plain" kind with dough, sauce, and minimal cheese
Italian tomato pie, made of thick dough with tomato sauce on top
Trenton tomato pie, a pizza in which tomato sauce is added after cheese and toppings

See also
 List of tomato dishes
 List of pies